Fetinino is a rural locality (a selo) in Rozhdestvenskoye Rural Settlement, Sobinsky District, Vladimir Oblast, Russia. The population was 462 as of 2010. There are 6 streets.

Geography 
Fetinino is located 42 km north of Sobinka (the district's administrative centre) by road. Stopino is the nearest rural locality.

References 

Rural localities in Sobinsky District
Vladimirsky Uyezd